Irnykshi (Irnıqşı) is a rural locality (a selo) and the administrative center of Irnykshinsky Selsoviet, Arkhangelsky District, Bashkortostan, Russia. The population was 447 as of 2010. There are 6 streets.

Geography 
Irnykshi is located 16 km west of Arkhangelskoye (the district's administrative centre) by road. Berezovka is the nearest rural locality.

References 

Rural localities in Arkhangelsky District